The Al Shindagha Sprint, is a horse race for horses aged three and over, run at a distance of 1,200 metres (six furlongs) on dirt in late January or early February at Meydan Racecourse in Dubai. The race is named after Al Shindagha, a district  in the city of Dubai.

The Al Shindagha Sprint  was first contested in 2000 on dirt at Nad Al Sheba Racecourse. It was moved to Meydan in 2010 where it was run on a synthetic Tapeta surface until reverting to dirt in 2015.

Records
Record time:
1:10.11 - Tropical Star 2007

Most successful horse:
 no horse has won the race more than once

Most wins by a jockey:
 4 - Pat Dobbs 2017, 2018, 2019, 2021

Most wins by a trainer:
 4 - Doug Watson 2017, 2018, 2019, 2021

Most wins by an owner:
 3 - Rashid bin Mohammed 2003, 2005

Winners

See also
 List of United Arab Emirates horse races

References

Horse races in the United Arab Emirates
Recurring events established in 2000
2000 establishments in the United Arab Emirates